Cary Ann Hearst trent (born August 10, 1979) is a folk/roots rock musical artist from South Carolina, US. She performs as a solo act, as well as with her husband, Michael Trent, in the band Shovels & Rope. Hearst's influences are rooted in the soulful, gritty sounds of Townes Van Zandt, Bob Dylan, and Loretta Lynn, among others.

Career 
Hearst got her first taste of fame when her song "Hell's Bells" was featured in the HBO vampire drama True Blood. She has eight albums to date, the first two (Dust and Bones, Lions and Lambs) as solo projects, and the most recent six (Shovels & Rope, O' Be Joyful, Swimming Time, Little Seeds, By Blood, and Manticore) as a collaboration with her husband, Michael Trent, under the moniker Shovels & Rope.

Personal life 
Hearst is a Nashville, Tennessee, native and graduated from MLK Magnet High School. Her mother and father both hail from the Mississippi Delta. She is married to Michael Trent.

References 

1979 births
Living people
American folk singers
American women rock singers
Musicians from Charleston, South Carolina
People from Nashville, Tennessee
21st-century American women singers
Dualtone Records artists
21st-century American singers